Juan Diego Piedrahita Cortes (Bogotá, July 27, 1992) is a Colombian racing driver. Piedrahita began his driving career at age of 7 karting in Mexico.  Piedrahita transitioned to auto racing in 2009 competing in the LATAM Challenge Series where he gained 2 podiums, finished 7th in overall points and 2nd in the rookie standings.

In 2010 Piedrahita competed in Star Mazda Championship for Team Apex where he competed in eight of the thirteen races and collected one top 5 and four top 10 finish. In 2011 he is competing in the U.S. F2000 National Championship for JDC MotorSports as part of the Road to Indy. Piedrahita finished seventh in the championship, capturing two podium finishes at the series' two oval races at Lucas Oil Raceway at Indianapolis and the Milwaukee Mile.

For the 2012 season, Piedrahita returned to Star Mazda full-time staying with the JDC MotorSports team. He finished seventh in points and captured a career-best second-place finish in race two in Toronto. He returned for another season in the series, now called Pro Mazda, in 2013, again with JDC. Piedrahita fell to ninth in points, suffering six DNF's, but did capture a second-place finish at the Milwaukee Mile and four third-place finishes.

For the 2014, Piedrahita will move up the Road to Indy to Indy Lights, signing with defending series champion team Schmidt Peterson Motorsports.

Racing record

American open–wheel racing
(key) (Races in bold indicate pole position; races in italics indicate fastest lap)

Star Mazda Championship / Pro Mazda Championship

U.S. F2000 National Championship

Indy Lights

Complete WeatherTech SportsCar Championship results
(key) (Races in bold indicate pole position) (Races in italics indicate fastest lap)

References

External links
 
 

1992 births
Living people
Sportspeople from Bogotá
Colombian racing drivers
Indy Pro 2000 Championship drivers
Indy Lights drivers
U.S. F2000 National Championship drivers
24 Hours of Daytona drivers
WeatherTech SportsCar Championship drivers
Belardi Auto Racing drivers
JDC Motorsports drivers
Arrow McLaren SP drivers
Team Pelfrey drivers